De Winton/South Calgary Airport  is located  east of De Winton, Alberta, Canada.

During World War II the aerodrome was known as RCAF Station De Winton, and hosted a Royal Air Force (RAF) elementary flying training school which eventually became part of the British Commonwealth Air Training Plan.

See also
List of airports in the Calgary area

References

External links
Page about this airport on COPA's Places to Fly airport directory

Registered aerodromes in Alberta
Canadian Forces bases in Canada (closed)
Airports of the British Commonwealth Air Training Plan
Foothills County